Talk Like Blood is the fifth full-length album by 31knots. It was released on October 11, 2005 by Polyvinyl Records in the US and by Own Records in Europe.

Track listing
"City of Dust" - 3:39
"Hearsay" - 3:59
"Thousand Wars" - 1:38
"Intuition Imperfected" - 3:27
"Chain Reaction" - 6:05
"Untitled (Interlude)" - 2:07
"A Void Employs a Kiss" - 3:18
"Proxy And Dominion" - 2:14
"Talk Like Blood" - 4:13
"Busy Is Bold" - 3:58
"Impromptu Disproving" - 3:26

2005 albums
31Knots albums